Yap High School (YHS) is a secondary school in Colonia, Yap Island, Yap State, Federated States of Micronesia. It is a part of the Yap State Department of Education.

Its current building was built between the late 1960s to the middle of the 1970s, a period when several other public high schools were built in the Trust Territory of the Pacific Islands.

In April 2015, Outer Islands High School in Ulithi was damaged. Therefore 12th grade students were sent to Yap High School complete their education.

See also
 Education in the Federated States of Micronesia

References

External links
 Yap High School

Yap
High schools in the Federated States of Micronesia